Mordellistena andreini is a species of beetle in the family Mordellidae. It is in the genus Mordellistena. It was discovered in 1933.

References

andreini
Beetles described in 1933